Mount Bombalai is a volcanic cone mountain in the Tawau Division of Sabah, Malaysia.

Geology 
The mountain is part of the Tawau volcanic field which contributed to the prominent topographic features of the Semporna Peninsula in northeastern Borneo and the western side of a valley in its middle section. The low volcanic cone is north of Sebatik Island and has a roughly 300-m-wide crater breached to the south. Two young lava flows extend almost to the coastal plain. The flows are considered younger than a lava flow radiocarbon dated at about 27,000 years before present, and the extrusion of basaltic lavas possibly continued into the Holocene epoch. Presence of geothermal activity has been reported in the surrounding mountains.

See also 
 List of volcanoes in Malaysia

References 

Mountains of Sabah
Mount Bombalai
Volcanoes of Malaysia
Extinct volcanoes
Tawau Division